Michael Ahern (born 20 January 1949) is a former Irish Fianna Fáil politician who served as a Minister of State from 1992 to 1993 and from 2002 to 2008. He served as a Teachta Dála (TD) for the Cork East constituency from 1982 to 2011.

Early life
Michael Ahern was born in Dungourney, County Cork. He was educated at Dungourney National School, Rockwell College, County Tipperary, and University College Dublin where he graduated with a Bachelor of Arts in Economics, Politics and Psychology. He also attended Kimmage Manor, Dublin where he studied Theology. For a brief period in the early 1970s, Ahern worked as a secondary school teacher. In 1973, he became an accountancy student at Coopers & Lybrand, Cork. In 1977, he became financial controller with a building construction firm in Cork.

Personal life
He is married to Margaret Monahan and they have three daughters, one of whom, Barbara Ahern, contested the 2016 general election in Cork East for Fianna Fáil unsuccessfully.

Michael Ahern is the son of Liam Ahern, a Senator between 1957 and 1973, and a TD from 1973 until 1974. Ahern's Grand-uncle, John Dinneen, was also a member of the Dáil between 1922 and 1927. Michael Ahern's brother Maurice Ahern was a long-standing Fianna Fáil member of Cork County Council but lost his seat in the 2009 local elections.

Political career
Ahern was first elected to Dáil Éireann at the February 1982 general election and held the until 2011. In 1984, he received his first major promotion when he became Fianna Fáil Deputy spokesperson on Transport in Charles Haughey's front bench. During his career in the Dáil, Ahern has served on a number of committees, including the Public Accounts Committee, the Joint Committee of Health and Children and the Joint Committee on Finance and Public Service. Between 1992 and 1993, he served as Minister of State at the Department of Industry and Commerce with responsibility for Science and Technology. Between 1994 and 1997, he served as Opposition Spokesperson on the Office of Public Works and Taxation. In 2002, Fianna Fáil were re-elected and Ahern was appointed as Minister of State at the Department of Enterprise, Trade and Employment with responsibility for Trade and Commerce.

After the 2007 general election he was appointed as Minister of State at the Department of Enterprise, Trade and Employment with responsibility for Innovation Policy. On 13 May 2008, after Brian Cowen became Taoiseach, Ahern lost his position as Minister of State and was not appointed to any other junior ministry.

He lost his seat at the 2011 general election. He was an unsuccessful candidate for Cork County Council at the 2014 local elections.

See also
Families in the Oireachtas

References

Bibliography
Nealon's Guide to the 30th Dáil and 23rd Seanad, Ed. Stephen Collins, Dublin, 2007

 

1949 births
Living people
Alumni of University College Dublin
Fianna Fáil TDs
Members of the 23rd Dáil
Members of the 24th Dáil
Members of the 25th Dáil
Members of the 26th Dáil
Members of the 27th Dáil
Members of the 28th Dáil
Members of the 29th Dáil
Members of the 30th Dáil
Ministers of State of the 26th Dáil
Ministers of State of the 29th Dáil
Ministers of State of the 30th Dáil
People educated at Rockwell College
Politicians from County Cork